Bryan Prunty (born 12 January 1983) is a Scottish footballer who is currently on the backroom staff at Scottish League One club Airdrieonians.

Career

Club
Prunty began his career with Celtic, but he failed to make a senior appearance. In January 2004, he moved to fellow Scottish Premier League club Aberdeen, making his senior debut in a Scottish Cup replay victory against Dundee on 21 January 2004. His first senior goal came on 27 March 2004 in a 3–1 defeat against Kilmarnock. At the end of the 2003–04 season, Prunty was told by manager Jimmy Calderwood that he could leave the club.

On 6 August 2004, Prunty signed for Inverness Caledonian Thistle. A year later he joined Airdrie United where he was recognised as the club's 2005–06 Player of the Year. Prunty then signed for Airdrie's Second Division rivals Ayr United in May 2008. In May 2009, he was recognised by his fellow professionals as 2nd Division player of the year for 2008–2009.

Prunty spent part of the 2009–10 season on loan at Stirling Albion. It was widely believed Prunty would sign permanently for Stirling in January 2010, but instead he was snapped up by Alloa Athletic. Prunty scored on his Alloa debut in a 2–0 win over Stenhousemuir.

On 16 May 2011, Prunty then joined Dumbarton. In February 2012, he scored an overhead kick against Stenhousemuir which was voted as SFL Goal of the Month, then a year later won the same award after scoring a stunning overhead bicycle kick from the edge of the box in a match against Livingston in February 2013, which was reported to have been viewed so many times it caused the Livingston club website to crash. The goal was also voted Goal of the Season at both the PFA Scotland and Scottish Football League end of season awards. On 16 May 2013, Prunty agreed a new one-year contract with Dumbarton. In May 2014 Prunty agreed a new one-year deal with Dumbarton.

Despite only signing a new deal in May 2014, Prunty joined Scottish League One Airdrieonians on August 30, 2014. He left the club in May 2016 after it was announced Airdrie would be operating full-time from June 2016, signing for Scottish League Two side Arbroath shortly after. After 18 months with the Red Lichties, Prunty signed for Lowland League side East Kilbride in January 2018. After five months with EK, he joined fellow Lowland League side BSC Glasgow in June 2018. He only spent a short period with BSC before joining Scottish Junior Football Association side Cumbernauld United.

Coaching career 
Prunty left Cumbernauld United in November 2018 to join the coaching staff at Airdrieonians, working alongside former manager Ian Murray.

International
Prunty played and scored for the Scotland Under-20 side in 2003 against Portugal. He also played three times for the Under-21 side in 2004.

Career statistics

Honours
 SFL Player of the Month: December 2005, November 2008
 PFA Scotland Second Division Player of the Season: 2008–09
 SFL Goal of the season: 2012–13
 PFA Scotland Goal of the Season: 2012–13

Arbroath

Scottish League Two (fourth tier): Winners 2016–17

References

External links

1983 births
Footballers from Coatbridge
Living people
Celtic F.C. players
Aberdeen F.C. players
Inverness Caledonian Thistle F.C. players
Airdrieonians F.C. players
Ayr United F.C. players
Stirling Albion F.C. players
Alloa Athletic F.C. players
Dumbarton F.C. players
Arbroath F.C. players
East Kilbride F.C. players
Scottish footballers
Scottish Premier League players
Scottish Football League players
Scotland under-21 international footballers
Association football forwards
Scottish Professional Football League players
Broomhill F.C. (Scotland) players
Lowland Football League players
Cumbernauld United F.C. players
Scottish Junior Football Association players